Kahiya (also Romanized as Kahyā; also known as Kahbā and Kakhiya) is a village in Dast Jerdeh Rural District, Chavarzaq District, Tarom County, Zanjan Province, Iran. At the 2006 census, its population was 525, in 137 families.

References 

Populated places in Tarom County